Oxyporus populinus is a plant pathogen affecting trees. It is not edible.

See also
 List of apricot diseases
 List of peach and nectarine diseases
 List of Platanus diseases
 List of sweetgum diseases

References

Fungi described in 1803
Fungal tree pathogens and diseases
Inedible fungi
Stone fruit tree diseases
Hymenochaetales
Fungi of Europe